Askaf is an iron ore prospect in Mauritania.

Railway 

The deposit straddles the SNIM railway 598 km from its port of export.

In 2014, Glencore Xstrata paid $1 billion to SNIM for access to that company's rail and port infrastructure, however, after iron ore prices dropped %40 in 2018, Glencore pulled out of the deal.

See also 
 Railway stations in Mauritania
 Iron ore in Africa

References 

Iron mines in Mauritania
Iron ore railways